The 2006 Elf Renault Clio Cup United Kingdom season began at Brands Hatch on 8 April and finished after 20 races over 10 events at Silverstone on 15 October. The Championship was won by Tom Onslow-Cole driving for Total Control Racing.

Teams & Drivers
All competitors raced in Renault Clio Cup 182s.

Calendar & Winners
The series supported the British Touring Car Championship at eight of the ten rounds. The series skipped the rounds at Mondello Park and Knockhill and instead raced at a BARC meeting at Knockhill on 17–18 June; and the World Series by Renault meeting at Donington Park on 9–10 September.

Standings
Points were awarded on a 32, 28, 25, 22, 20, 18, 16, 14, 12, 11, 10, 9, 8, 7, 6, 5, 4, 3, 2, 1 basis to the top 20 finishers in each race, with 2 bonus points for the fastest lap in each race. A driver's best 18 scores counted towards the championship.

Drivers' Championship

Notes:
1. - Paul Rivett was docked points at the first Brands Hatch meeting and Knockhill.
2. - Michael Doyle was docked points at Oulton Park.
3. - Nick Adcock was docked points at Knockhill and the first Donington Park meeting.
4. - Phil House was docked points at the first Donington Park meeting.
5. - Steven Hunter was docked points at the first Donington Park meeting.

Entrants' Championship
Points were awarded on the same scale as the drivers' championship but without the fastest lap bonus. An entrant's two highest placed cars in each race scored points and all scores counted towards the championship.

Winter Cup
The Winter Cup was contested over two rounds at Brands Hatch on 4–5 November and Croft on 11 November. It was won by Niki Lanik driving for Drive 4 Life with SVE.

Due to low grid numbers, the Clios raced simultaneously with other series at both events (Classic Touring Cars at Brands Hatch and Northern Sports Saloons at Croft).

Teams & Drivers

Calendar & Winners

Drivers' Championship
Points were awarded on the same scale as the main championship. All scores counted.

External links
 Official website
 ClioCup.com
 Timing Solutions Ltd.

Renault Clio Cup
Renault Clio Cup UK seasons